Arthur Osborne may refer to:

Arthur Osborne (politician), New Zealand politician
Arthur Osborne (writer), English writer on mysticism

See also
Arthur Osborn, executed for the murder of Fred N. Selak, the Hermit of Grand Lake, Colorado